Avalski Venac (Cyrillic: Авалски венац) is a proposed municipality of the City of Belgrade, the capital of Serbia.

Movement 

Movement for creation of the municipality began in 1996 and was enhanced since 2002 and successful campaigning for the re-creation of the municipality of Surčin, which split from the municipality of Zemun, almost 40 years after it was annexed to Zemun. Originally, the movement sought to re-create to former municipality of Ripanj, which was annexed to the municipality of Voždovac and now constitutes its southern part, which is at the most distant almost 40 kilometers away from the municipal seat. It should constitute from the rural settlements of Ripanj, Beli Potok, Zuce and Pinosava, all in the municipality of Voždovac, but also including Vrčin, in the municipality of Grocka. All settlements are located on the sloped of the Avala mountain, distant from their municipal seats and have similar communal problems, notably the notorious summer's water shortages. The combined population of the settlements is 27,688 by the 2002 census of population.

Official proceedings 

In September 2007 an official motion was started by the municipality of Voždovac to create new municipality and in October 2007 municipal assembly began construction of the building in central Beli Potok which would serve as an outer representation of the assembly and the future municipal seat if new municipality is to be created. The new administrative center was finished in April 2008. President of the municipal assembly Goran Lukačević said that the opinions of the population will ensue soon and that inhabitants of the neighborhood of Resnik in the municipality of Rakovica will be also asked to join the new municipality.

See also 

 List of former and proposed municipalities of Belgrade

References 

Former and proposed municipalities of Belgrade